A podetium (plural: podetia) is the upright secondary thallus in Cladonia lichens. It is a hollow stalk extending from the primary thallus. Podetia can be pointed stalks, club like, cupped, or branched in shape and may or may not contain the ascocarp, the fruiting body, of the lichen. It is not considered part of the primary thallus as it is a fruiting structure for reproduction. 

A lichen can be described as "podetiate" when it forms a podetium.

References

Fungal morphology and anatomy